Willoughby is a minor animated cartoon fictional character in the Warner Bros. Looney Tunes series of cartoons.  A lackadaisical hound dog, Willoughby is characterized by his below-average intelligence and overall gullibility. Creator Tex Avery based Willoughby on the character Willie from John Steinbeck's 1937 novella Of Mice and Men. The character's name has occasionally been changed to Rosebud, Lenny, or Sylvester from cartoon to cartoon.

Created during the golden age of American animation by Tex Avery, who would voice Willoughby from 1940's Of Fox and Hounds until 1941's The Heckling Hare, the character was later voiced by Kent Rogers (1941–1942), Mel Blanc (1942–1947), Tedd Pierce (1944), and Stan Freberg (1952). Other than a cameo appearance in Who Framed Roger Rabbit (1988), Willoughby has not appeared in any new media since 1952's Foxy by Proxy.

History
Willoughby first appeared in the 1940 cartoon Of Fox and Hounds. He was created and voiced by Tex Avery. According to Chuck Jones, the character was based on Lennie, from Of Mice and Men (of which the title of Of Fox and Hounds is a knockoff). Critic Steven Hartley described this short as lacking in creativity, originality, excitement, and story construction, particularly compared to Avery's seminal earlier work A Wild Hare.

Willoughby later appears in other Warner Brothers animated shorts, including The Heckling Hare (1941), The Crackpot Quail (1941), and Nutty News (1942), as the lead dog of a fox hunting party. A fundamentally similar character, Laramore, appears in To Duck or Not to Duck (1943), albeit with a fully brown coat of fur. Willoughby's brief career was essentially over before the end of World War II.

These dogs were mostly similar character design in Porky's Bear Facts (1941), Ding Dog Daddy (1942), To Duck or Not to Duck (1943), A Corny Concerto (1943), Hare Ribbin' (1944), The Goofy Gophers (1947), and possibly Inki at the Circus (1947).

Appearances
 Of Fox and Hounds (1940)
 The Crackpot Quail (1941)
 The Heckling Hare (1941)
 Nutty News (1942) (cameo in a B&W cartoon)
 The Hep Cat (1942) (as Rosebud)
 Ding Dog Daddy (1942)
 An Itch in Time (1943)
 Hare Force (1944) (as Sylvester)
 A Horse Fly Fleas (1947) (shaped like the Barnyard Dawg)
 Foxy by Proxy (1952)

In other media
Willoughby was planned to be made as a cameo in the deleted scene "Acme's Funeral" from the 1988 film Who Framed Roger Rabbit. He also appears with other animated characters scared when Casper the Friendly Ghost appears at the funeral.

References

Looney Tunes characters
Fictional dogs
Male characters in animation
Film characters introduced in 1940